Tevin William McDonald (born July 17, 1992) is an American professional gridiron football safety who is currently a free agent. He played college football at Eastern Washington after leaving the UCLA program.

College career
McDonald played at UCLA from 2010 to 2013 when he was dismissed by Jim Mora for off-field extracurricular issues. He redshirted as a freshman in 2010, then went on to play in 2011 and 2012 for UCLA. McDonald was named a freshman All-American in 2011.  In 2012, he ranked third on the team in tackles with 94.  He later played for the Eastern Washington team for the 2013 and 2014 seasons, and finished his senior year with 86 tackles and 7 interceptions.

Professional career 

On September 19, 2015, McDonald was promoted to the 53-man roster. On September 22, 2015, McDonald was waived. On October 10, 2015, McDonald was promoted to the 53-man roster after the release of Taylor Mays. On October 24, 2015, McDonald was waived after the signing of Shelby Harris. On November 7, 2015, McDonald was promoted to the 53-man roster after the release of C. J. Wilson. On December 19, 2015, McDonald was promoted to the 53-man roster after right tackle Austin Howard was placed on Injured Reserve.

Personal life
Tevin is the son of six-time NFL All-Pro and Super Bowl-winning safety Tim McDonald, who most recently coached defensive backs in 2016 for the Buffalo Bills. He also has a brother, T. J. McDonald, who is currently a safety for the Miami Dolphins.

References

External links
Eastern Washington bio
UCLA Bio

1992 births
Living people
American football safeties
Canadian football defensive backs
American players of Canadian football
UCLA Bruins football players
Eastern Washington Eagles football players
Oakland Raiders players
BC Lions players
Players of American football from California
Sportspeople from Fresno, California